Mill Hill County High School is a large secondary school with academy status located in Mill Hill, London, England. It was the first comprehensive school in the United Kingdom to have had a student accepted on the Morehead-Cain merit scholarship program in the United States and is an official Morehead-Cain nominating school.

History
The current school was created as a merger between Moat Mount Comprehensive and Orange Hill school in Burnt Oak after the latter was closed. Orange Hill had originally been a grammar school and Moat Mount a secondary modern before the ending of the grammar school system in the Borough of Barnet in the early seventies. Moat Mount Comprehensive had a sixth form of up to 80 pupils in the mid-Seventies and a total school population of around 970 pupils.

Admissions
It is for students aged 11 to 18. The school has 1,700 pupils as of 2020. The current headteacher is Andy Stainton.

Subjects

At Key Stage 3 all students study
English
Mathematics
Science (Biology, Chemistry, Physics)
Computer Science
Design and Technology
Religious Studies
Geography
History
Art
Music
Dance and Drama
Physical Education
PSCHE (Personal, Social Citizenship and Health Education)
German
French

At Key stage 4 all students study
English
Mathematics
Science (Double or Triple)
French, German or Spanish (exceptions for certain individuals)
Religious Studies (exceptions for certain individuals)
PE (compulsory for non GCSE exam students)
PSCHE (Personal, Social, Citizenship & Health Education)
Geography or History (Or Both if chosen)

Plus two subjects chosen from
Art
Business Studies
Computer Science
Dance
Drama
Economics
Food Preparation and Nutrition
French
Geography
German
History
Media Studies
Music
Photography
Physical Education 
Product Design
Spanish
Textiles

Selection of GCSE option subjects takes place in Year 9. The Science course leads to double GCSE certification. For English, students have the opportunity to study both English Language and English Literature to GCSE level. ICT and Religious Education can lead to a full or a half GCSE. Languages are chosen in the end of Year 8.

Notable former pupils

Mill Hill County High School
Jacob Collier, musician
Michael Offei, actor
Tamara Smart, actor
Ovie Soko, basketball player
Ben Strevens, footballer
Martine Wright, sitting volleyball player

Orange Hill Grammar School
 Matthew Ashman, guitarist with Adam and the Ants
 Sir Bill Callaghan, Chair of the Legal Services Commission
 Gillian Chan novelist
 Air Vice-Marshal Paul Clark CB, former GEC-Marconi then BAE Systems North America executive, and Commandant of the RAF Signals Engineering Establishment (RAFSEE) at RAF Henlow (now home of the RAF Signals Museum) from 1990-1
 Sir Ronald Mourad Cohen, venture capitalist, and Chairman since 2005 of the Portland Trust
 David Dein, former Arsenal FC vice-chairman
 John Ellis (guitarist)
 Robert Elms, writer and lunchtime broadcaster on BBC London 94.9
 Frank Jarvis (actor), known for The Italian Job
 Daniel Kleinman, music video director, who formed Bazooka Joe (band) with John Ellis which later featured Adam Ant as singer; his TV advertisements include the 1990s Boddingtons ice-cream van with Melanie Sykes, and the 2005 noitulovE for Guinness
 Malcolm McLaren (also known as Malcolm Edwards, and passed three O-levels), Manager of the Sex Pistols
 Stephen Mallatratt, playwright who wrote Island at War (ITV, 2003)
 Kate Parker, Great Britain Olympic hockey player
 Jean Simmons OBE, Hollywood actress
 David Troughton, actor, son of Patrick Troughton
 Michael Troughton, actor, son of Patrick Troughton younger brother of David Troughton
Clive Sinclair, novelist and critic.

Orange Hill Senior High School
 Angus Fraser MBE, former England cricketer and Managing Director since 2009 of Middlesex County Cricket Club

See also
 Mill Hill School, nearby independent school

References

External links
 Official site
 2003 inspection report (pdf)
 EduBase

Academies in the London Borough of Barnet
Secondary schools in the London Borough of Barnet
Mill Hill